Volcan de la Pena is a volcano in Chile.

Volcan de la Pena is part of the High Andes of Chile, between 25° and 26°30′ degrees south. The Andes there at altitudes over  feature a number of volcanoes, as well as products of eruptive activity. The Salar Grande lies east of Chato Aislado. Chato Aislado has been proposed as a geosite location for Chile.

The 12 million years old cone is capped off by a lava dome and has been affected by numerous sector collapses in the past, which have generated hummocky deposits. Most of these deposits are degraded, as are the collapse scars.

References

Sources 

 

Miocene volcanoes
Volcanoes of Chile